Pornography in the Americas consists of pornography made and viewed in North, Central and South American and Caribbean countries and territories. The culture of Latin America and French America has traditionally been strongly influenced by the Roman Catholic Church, which tends to be socially conservative. Pornography is least restricted and essentially legal in those countries where the Catholic church is politically and socially the weakest, such as Brazil, Colombia and Mexico. The viewing of pornography in the region has been popularized by the Internet and DVDs.

Pornography between consenting adults is legal in many American countries including Colombia and Uruguay.

Bahamas 
The Bahamian penal code prohibits the production and distribution of obscene publications. Many types of pornography are prohibited in the Bahamas, however law enforcement is relaxed and does not usually enforce the prohibition. Pornography is available on Bahamian cable television and in 2014 ZNS-TV broadcast a report on the establishment of a local pornography industry in the Bahamas.

Brazil 
In Brazil, pornographic film actors must be 18 or older. Pornography which does not involve bestiality is legal when sold in public places. Depiction of sex with animals is legal. However, magazine and DVD covers that depict genitalia must not be visible from public view, and pornography can only be sold to people 18 or older.

Canada 

The laws of Canada permit the sale of hardcore pornography to anyone over the age of eighteen. While persons below that age may have pornography in their possession, its sale to them is prohibited.

Most hardcore pornography is sold in adult stores or on adult websites.

Chile 
Chile's pornography industry began in the 1950s and grew significantly until the 1973 Chilean coup d'état. Under the subsequent military dictatorship of Chile the industry was suppressed. Following the Chilean transition to democracy and the development of the Internet, the pornography industry in the country has begun to expand again.

Colombia 
Colombia has become a big hub for live web cam streams and has seen a rise in camgirls as a result of the increase in access to the internet. Almost 98% of "latin" models come from Colombia while only 2% come from Mexico and Brazil.

Cuba 
Pornography is illegal in Cuba, however the laws were relaxed in the 2010s.

Mexico 
Mexico is one of the largest producers of child pornography in the world.

United States 

In the United States, courts have repeatedly confirmed that obscenity is not legal in the United States; it is not entitled to the freedom of the press protection contained in the First Amendment to the United States Constitution. Pornography has become semi-legal, then in practice legal, because it has been "shown" not to be obscene.

The Miller test, developed in the 1973 case Miller v. California, was used for some years to define material as pornographic but not obscene. It has three parts:

 Whether "the average person, applying contemporary community standards", would find that the work, taken as a whole, appeals to the prurient interest,
 Whether the work depicts or describes, in a patently offensive way, sexual conduct specifically defined by applicable state law,
 Whether the work, taken as a whole, lacks serious literary, artistic, political, or scientific value.

The work is considered obscene only if all three conditions are satisfied. Local areas are permitted to develop their own laws on the issue, as long as they do not conflict with federal law.

Pornography is a large industry that involves major entertainment companies, which offer pornography films through cable channels and in-room movies in hotels. Pornography distribution changed radically during the 1980s, with VHS and cable television largely displacing X-rated theaters. VHS distribution, in turn, has been replaced by DVD and Internet distribution for niche markets. Pornography generates billions of dollars in sales in the United States alone. An estimated 211 new pornographic films are made every week in the United States.

Venezuela 
Despite the fact that in Venezuela pornography can be viewed through cable television systems, the government of that country has been taking anti-pornography stances since 2018. On June 19, it was reported that CANTV, the country's largest Internet provider, censored 3 pages of pornographic videos, XVideos, PornHub and YouPorn. However, these three websites can be viewed through other providers or through IP or DNS changes.31 Also, there are rumors that webcam sites could be banned in that country.

See also 
 Pornography by region
 Pornography in Asia
 Pornography in Europe

References

 
Pornography by region